J. Sterling Livingston (June 7, 1916 – February 14, 2010) was an American entrepreneur, management consultant, and professor at the Harvard Business School for 25 years.

Early life
Sterling was born in Salt Lake City, Utah on June 7, 1916, and grew up in and near Chino, Glendale and Pomona, California. He worked as a wiper on board a cargo ship, then attended Glendale Junior College, the University of Southern California and the Harvard Business School, where he received his Master of Business Administration in 1940. During the Second World War he taught the Navy Supply Corps.

Career
Following the war Sterling received his PhD in Business Administration from Harvard, where he became a professor and taught for 25 years. His articles "Myth of the Well-Educated Manager" and "Pygmalion in Management" were published in the Harvard Business Review. He founded or co-founded several consulting companies including the Logistics Management Institute.

Death

Sterling died on February 14, 2010, and was buried at the Columbia Gardens Cemetery in Arlington, Virginia.

References

External links
 
 

University of Southern California alumni
Harvard Business School faculty
Glendale Community College (California) alumni
20th-century American businesspeople
American consulting businesspeople
Harvard Business School alumni
American business writers
Businesspeople from Salt Lake City
1916 births
2010 deaths
Business educators
American management consultants